Carl De Chenu is a former professional rugby league footballer who played in the 2000s.

International honours
Carl De Chenu won 4 caps (1 as substitute) for Ireland in 2003–2004 while at Sheffield Eagles.

For the Senior national team he holds heritage number #107.

References

Living people
Crusaders Rugby League players
Ireland national rugby league team coaches
Ireland national rugby league team players
Place of birth missing (living people)
Rugby league centres
Rugby league wingers
Sheffield Eagles players
Year of birth missing (living people)